Sartang-e Landeh (also Romanized as Sartang-e Lendeh) is a village in Tayebi-ye Garmsiri-ye Shomali Rural District, in the Central District of Landeh County, Kohgiluyeh and Boyer-Ahmad Province, Iran. At the 2006 census, its population was 16, in 6 families.

References 

Populated places in Landeh County